José Guillermo "Memo" Gidley is a Mexican-born racing driver, of German and Canadian ancestry, born in La Paz, Baja California Sur, Mexico on September 29, 1970. He holds dual citizenship - American and Mexican.

In his early years, he sold his apartment to fund his career and spent 4 months homeless living in his car. He worked at the Jim Russell racing school as a mechanic to fund his career for some time, eventually getting a chance in Champ Car with Derrick Walker in 1999, although this was as a short-term replacement. He did the same task for Gerry Forsythe a year later, and Chip Ganassi in 2001, twice coming close to race victories. He nearly retained his drive for 2002 - Chip later suggested that they keep Bruno Junqueira over him as the Brazilian was under contract.

He has raced assorted sports cars since, although he made two Champ Car starts for Rocketsports in 2004, and briefly ran in the rival IRL series. Since 2005 he has competed full-time in the Grand-Am Rolex Sports Car Series, co-driving with Michael McDowell to a victory in the Mexico City season finale. In 2006 he raced in the Team Playboy cars and in 2007 he partnered Max Angelelli in the SunTrust Racing team. In 2010 Gidley co-drove Team CytoSport's Porsche RS Spyder with Germany's Klaus Graf and Sascha Maassen to second in class (and overall) at Laguna Seca, but he reportedly hasn't given up on a return to major open wheel racing.

In the 2014 24 Hours of Daytona, Gidley suffered serious injuries when his Corvette DP slammed into the back of a Ferrari being driven by Matteo Malucelli. Gidley was taken by ambulance to Halifax Health Medical Center, where doctors diagnosed him with a broken back and leg and arm injuries. Gidley had eight surgeries that took him three years to recover.

Motorsports career results

American Open-Wheel racing results
(key)

Complete USF2000 National Championship results

Atlantic Championship

CART/Champ Car World Series

 ^ New points system implemented in 2004

Indy Racing League

Indy 500 results

Complete American Le Mans Series results

 * Season still in progress.

WeatherTech SportsCar Championship results
(key)(Races in bold indicate pole position, Results are overall/class)

References

External links
Driver Database Profile
 http://memogidley.com/

IndyCar Series drivers
Champ Car drivers
Atlantic Championship drivers
1970 births
Living people
Mexican racing drivers
American racing drivers
Mexican people of Canadian descent
Mexican people of German descent
Mexican emigrants to the United States
Sportspeople from Baja California Sur
People from La Paz, Baja California Sur
Rolex Sports Car Series drivers
24 Hours of Daytona drivers
American Le Mans Series drivers
Trans-Am Series drivers
Barber Pro Series drivers
WeatherTech SportsCar Championship drivers
U.S. F2000 National Championship drivers
Chip Ganassi Racing drivers
Highcroft Racing drivers
Dale Coyne Racing drivers
Walker Racing drivers
Forsythe Racing drivers
Team Pelfrey drivers
Dreyer & Reinbold Racing drivers
Rocketsports Racing drivers
JDC Motorsports drivers
Michelin Pilot Challenge drivers